Tribute to Caesar may refer to:
Render unto Caesar, an episode in the New Testament
Tribute to Caesar (Manfredi), a painting of that episode
Tribute to Caesar (del Sarto and Allori), 1520s and 1582 fresco